Archbishopric of Justiniana Prima was an Eastern Christian autonomous Archbishopric with see in the city of Justiniana Prima and jurisdiction over the Late Roman Diocese of Dacia in central parts of the Southeastern Europe.

History 
The archdiocese was established in 535 AD by Emperor Justinian I, in his presumed home-town of Justiniana Prima (near present-day Lebane, in Southern Serbia).

The establishment is mentioned in Justinian's own Novel XI from 535, when he promotes the metropolitan to an archbishop, independent from the Archbishop of Thessalonica. The establishment is seen as part of the feud between Justinian and the archbishop of Eastern Illyricum, who was a papal vicar.

Its last mention is in 602, amid the Slav raids on the Balkans.

Administration 
Its cathedral archiepiscopal see was at Justiniana Prima. According to Novella 11, issued in 535, the first Archbishop received canonical jurisdiction over the following Byzantine provinces, mainly on the territory of the Diocese of Dacia:
 Dacia Mediterranea
 Dacia Ripensis
 Moesia Prima
 Dardania
 Praevalitana
 Macedonia Secunda
 Part of Pannonia Secunda 

But by 545, in the Novella 131, Macedonia Secunda was omitted.

Dioceses 
Bishopric of Niš, seat at Naissopolis (Niš, Serbia)

Archbishops 
 Catelianus (Catellian), metropolitan becoming first archbishop in 535 AD
Benenatus c.553
 Johannes, fl. 595

Successor titles

Eastern Orthodox 
The Archbishopric of Ohrid was seen as a successor of the old archbishopric. Archbishop John IV, nephew of emperor Alexios I Komnenos, resurrected the title of Archbishop of Justiniana Prima in 1143 for his own use.

Roman Catholic titular see 
It is one of the titular sees listed in the Annuario Pontificio.

It has had the following incumbents, all of the archiepiscopal (intermediary) rank:
 Giovanni Panico (1935.10.17 – 1962.03.19) (later Cardinal)
 Aurelio Sabattani (1965.06.24 – 1983.02.02) (later Cardinal)
 Édouard Gagnon, Sulpicians (P.S.S.) (1983.07.07 – 1985.05.25),  (later Cardinal
 Jean-Claude Périsset (1998.11.12 – ...), Apostolic Nuncio (papal ambassador) emeritus to Germany

See also 
 Archbishopric of Ohrid
 List of catholic dioceses in Serbia

References

Sources 

 
 
 
 
 
 
 
 
 
 
 Arthur Ewans, Ancient Illyria: An Archaeological Exploration
 The challenge of our past: studies in Orthodox Canon law and Church history
 Carolyn S. Snively, "Dacia Mediterranea and Macedonia Secunda in the 6th century"

External links 
 GigaCatholic - Catholic (titular) see

Byzantine Serbia
6th century in Serbia
Justinian I
Dioceses established in the 6th century
Justiniana Prima, Archdiocese
Leskovac
History of Christianity in Serbia